Neal's Landing is a recreational and historic site on the Chattahoochee River in the northern Florida panhandle area outside of Bascom, Florida by the Florida-Georgia state line several miles from the Alabama border. There is also a Neals Landing in Georgia just over the 91 bridge.

Neal's Landing is home to Neal's Landing Park and is used for fishing and camping. This site was the location of a former Indian village of Ekanchattee.

History
During the 19th century, the steamboat paddlewheel Eagle caught fire in the area while making its way down the river from Columbus, Georgia to Apalachicola and several people died. A gold shipment sank but was recovered.shipment of gold from a Columbus 
bank wound up on the bottom of the Chattahoochee River. In 1912,
Neal's Landing was the site of a deadly ferry disaster.

References

Parks in Jackson County, Florida
Tourist attractions in Jackson County, Florida